Joseph Langlois (15 April 1909 – 19 November 1964) was a Liberal party member of the House of Commons of Canada. Born in Varennes, Quebec, he was a notary by career.

He was first elected at the Berthier—Maskinongé riding in the 1949 general election then re-elected for successive terms at Berthier—Maskinongé—delanaudière in 1953 and 1957. After completing his final federal term, the 23rd Canadian Parliament, Langlois did not seek re-election in the 1958 election.

External links
 
 Mention of Joseph Langlois' death 

1909 births
1964 deaths
Liberal Party of Canada MPs
Members of the House of Commons of Canada from Quebec
People from Varennes, Quebec